The following is a list of notable machinima-related events in the year 2005. These include several new machinima productions, season finales, and the 2005 Machinima Film Festival.

Events
January 26 – Paul Marino moderated a discussion panel on machinima at the 2005 Sundance Film Festival.
June 21 – Electronic Arts released its first-person shooter computer game Battlefield 2.
October 27 – October 28 – The Academy of Machinima Arts & Sciences presented machinima pieces at the Austin Game Conference.
November 8 – Lionhead Studios released its simulation game The Movies, the first game to contain dedicated tools for creating machinima.
November 12 – The Academy of Machinima Arts & Sciences held the 2005 Machinima Film Festival at the American Museum of the Moving Image.

Notable releases

February 9 – Edgeworks Entertainment's The Codex premiered.
May 18 –  of Rooster Teeth Productions' Red vs. Blue ended with episode 57.
June 28 – This Spartan Life premiered with the first two modules of episode 1.
August 13 – The Codex ended with episode 20. 
August 29 –  of Red vs. Blue began with episode 58.
September 27 – Rooster Teeth Productions' PANICS premiered.
October 18 – PANICS ended with episode 4.
November 22 – Alex Chan posts The French Democracy to The Movies website.

Active series

The Codex (2005)
Fire Team Charlie (2003–2005)
Neverending Nights (premiered 2004)
PANICS (2005)
Red vs. Blue (2003–)
The Strangerhood (2004–2006)
Strangerhood Studios (2005)
This Spartan Life (premiered 2005)
Time Commanders (2003–2005)

Awards

Academy of Machinima Arts & Sciences
Best Picture: Game: On
Best Series: This Spartan Life
Best Direction: Whiplash
Best Virtual Performance: A Few Good G-Men

Rockets on Prisoner
Best Movie: The Codex episode 20 ("The End of All Things")
Best Halo 2 Movie: The Codex episode 20 ("The End of All Things")
Best Series: Red vs. Blue

Notes

References

 

Machinima
Machinima by year